The Dublin Hospitals Rugby Cup is a rugby union competition contested by the teaching hospitals in Dublin since 1881. The competition has a claim to the oldest rugby union competition in the world. The United Hospitals Cup in London was started 6 years earlier, but 12 years were not played during the periods of World War I and World War II.

History

The competition was inaugurated in 1881 by a group of Dublin surgeons and physicians. Dr Frank Cassidy served as the first president. The trophy was created by Paul Storr in 1812 as a hunting trophy. It was purchased in 1881 for £50. It remains the oldest sporting trophy in Ireland for which there is an annual competition. 

The participants of the inaugural tournament included Richmond, Jervis Street, Sir Patrick Dun's, Royal City of Dublin Hospital, Adelaide, Mercer's Hospital, Dr Steevens' Hospital, and Meath. The inaugural title was won by the Meath Hospital who beat Sir Patrick Dun's Hospital at Lansdowne Road.

Predating the cup, Dublin United Hospitals representative sides played an annual charity match against other Dublin rugby clubs playing as 'County Dublin' in order to raise money for the Hospital Sunday Fund from 1878 until the 1950s. 

The Dublin Hospitals representative sides have also played annual games against the London  United Hospitals.
London beat the Dublin hospitals at Lansdowne Road in 1894 inaugural game.
The Dublin Hospitals won the matchup in 1910, 1912,
1924, 1928, and 1947.

Eligibility to play for hospitals was initially restricted to medical students and interns, this was later expanded to up to 6 graduates per team in 1990.

Current competition
The final, previously played in February at Lansdowne Road, has been played in December at Anglesea Road since the 1960s. In recent years, following the closure and amalgamation of hospitals, five teams compete for the cup: Beaumont Hospital, the  Mater Hospital, St. Vincent's University Hospital, the Federated Hospitals, and the Veterinary Hospital which joined in 2011.  

The Dental Hospital, which had many memorable victories in the late 1950s and the 1970s, eventually could no longer field a team and joined forces with its Trinity neighbours. The Trinity Federated Hospitals team or Feds represent Dublin Dental University Hospital, Tallaght University Hospital, and St. James's Hospital. Richmond and Jervis amalgamated in 1973 to form an RCSI rugby club, which would win 8 championships during their 14 years in the competition. The side was succeeded by Beaumont in 1987 following the closure of both hospitals.

International Rugby
Many medical students and newly qualified doctors who have played in the Hospitals Cup have gone on to represent Ireland or other countries at test level. This occurred more frequently during the early years of international rugby. Of the first 200 players capped for Ireland, 44 had trained in Dublin hospitals. Over 90 players have also been capped for Ireland. This list below includes some of those players:

 Internationals

Aidan Brady
Barry Bresnihan (Mater)
Lawrence Bulger (Richmond)
Michael Joseph Bulger (Richmond)
Emmet Byrne (Beaumont)
Frank Byrne
Andrew Clinch
Jamie Clinch (United Dublin Hospitals Rugby Union)
Morgan Crowe (Richmond Hospital)
Thomas Crean (St. Vincent's)
Denis Cussen
Fergus Dunlea
Con Feighery
Tom Feighery
E. G. Forrest
Don Hingerty
Niall Hogan (Beaumont)
Paddy Johns (Dental, Feds)
Louis Magee
Jack Maloney
Terence Millin (Dun's)
Al Moroney
Bill Mulcahy (St. Vincent's)
Karl Mullen (Dun's)
John Murray
Paul Murray (Richmond Hospital)
Kevin Quinn
Hubie O'Connor (Dun's)
James Murphy O'Connor
Frank O'Driscoll
Charles Rooke
Gerry Tormey

 Internationals
Jon Raphael

 Internationals
Mihai Vioreanu (Mater)

 Internationals
Nicolaas Jan Valkenburg van Druten (Meath)

 Internationals
Dick Cooke

Winners

1881 Meath
1882 Meath
1883 Meath
1884 Dun's
1885 Dun's
1886 Dun's
1887 Dun's
1888 Dun's
1889 Dun's
1890 Meath
1891 Meath
1892 Meath
1893 Dun's
1894 Dun's
1895 Dun's
1896 Richmond
1897 Mater
1898 Dun's
1899 Mater
1900 Dun's
1901 Dun's
1902 Meath
1903 Dun's
1904 Dun's
1905 Dun's
1906 Adelaide
1907 Adelaide
1908 Adelaide
1909 Adelaide
1910 Adelaide 
1911 Richmond
1912 Dun's
1913 St. Vincent's
1914 St. Vincent's
1915―19 Suspended
1920
1921 Meath
1922 Dun's
1923 Dental
1924 Richmond
1925 Richmond
1926 Richmond
1927 Dun's
1928 St. Vincent's
1929 Richmond
1930 Dun's
1931 Richmond
1932 Adelaide
1933 St. Vincent's
1934 Dun's
1935 Richmond
1936 St. Vincent's
1937 Mater
1938 Mater
1939 St. Vincent's
1940 Mater
1941 St. Vincent's
1942 Mater
1943 Richmond
1944 Richmond
1945 Mater
1946 Mater
1947 Jervis
1948 Jervis
1949 Jervis
1950 Adelaide
1951 Adelaide
1952
1953 Mater
1954 St. Vincent's
1955 Mater
1956 St. Vincent's
1957 Dun's
1958 Dun's
1959 Dental
1960 Dental
1961 St. Vincent's
1962 St. Vincent's
1963 Mater
1964 Mater
1965 St. Vincent's
1966 St. Vincent's
1967 Mater
1968 St. Vincent's
1969 St. Vincent's
1970 St. Vincent's
1971 Dental
1972 St. Vincent's
1973 Dental
1974 St. Vincent's
1975 St. Vincent's
1976 Richmond-Jervis
1977 Richmond-Jervis
1978 Dental
1979 Richmond-Jervis
1980 Dental
1981 Richmond-Jervis
1982 Richmond-Jervis
1983 Richmond-Jervis
1984 Richmond-Jervis
1985 Richmond-Jervis
1986 Federated
1987 Beaumont 
1988 Beaumont
1989 Beaumont
1990 Beaumont
1991 Federated
1992 St. Vincent's
1993 St. Vincent's
1994 Beaumont
1995 St. Vincent's
1996 Mater
1997 St. Vincent's
1998 Mater
1999 St. Vincent's
2000 Mater
2001 Mater
2002 Mater
2003 Mater
2004 Mater
2005 Mater
2006 Mater
2007 Beaumont
2008 Beaumont
2009 St. Vincent's
2010 St. Vincent's
2011 St. Vincent's
2012 St. Vincent's
2013 St. Vincent's
2014 St. Vincent's
2015 Mater
2016 Mater
2017 Beaumont
2018 Mater
2019 Mater
2020 Cancelled
2021 Mater
2022 Mater

Roll of honour

See also

 List of oldest rugby union competitions
 United Hospitals Cup

References

Rugby union in Ireland
Rugby union competitions
Rugby union competitions in Leinster
Rugby union trophies and awards
1881 establishments in Ireland